Munnuru Kapu is a caste in Telangana, India. Prior to the establishment of Telangana as a state separate from that of Andhra Pradesh, of which previously it had been a region, there were four different Kapu communities in the various districts of Andhra Pradesh, being  the Munnuru kapu in Telangana, the Toorpu in the areas of Srikakulam, Vizianagaram and Visakhapatnam, the Balija in Rayalaseema and those known simply as Kapu in the Godavari districts, Guntur and Krishna. People belonging to  Munnuru Kapu Caste in Telangana is primarily Agrarian community and own lands. They are often referred as Patels in Telangana region and falls under Kshatriya. Munnuru Kapu contributes the major percentage of population in Telangana than any other caste. Traditionally, they were a diverse community of merchants and cultivators.

See also 
 Munnuru

References 

Social groups of Telangana
Other Backward Classes